Allaire is an unincorporated community located within Wall Township in Monmouth County, New Jersey, United States. As of the 2010 United States Census, the ZIP Code Tabulation Area for ZIP Code 07727 had a population of 7,050.

References

Wall Township, New Jersey
Unincorporated communities in Monmouth County, New Jersey
Unincorporated communities in New Jersey